Yevgeny Aronovich Dolmatovsky (5 May 1915 – 10 September 1994) was a Soviet and Russian poet and lyricist. He was born and died in Moscow.

Examples of his songs
 Ballad of the Siberian Land (music by Nikolai Kryukov) - 1947
The theme song of the film, Ballad of Siberia
The theme song of the film, Encounter at the Elbe
 Song of the Forests （music by Dmitri Shostakovich, Opus 81） - 1949
 The Pioneers Plant Trees
This song is from "Four Songs on Verses by Dolmatovsky, for Voice, Wordless Chorus & Piano, Opus 86 (1951). It is well known in Russia that Yuri Gagarin was singing this song while circling the earth as the first man in space.
A Soviet cosmonaut song singing about the dream of space travel, and eventual colonisation of Mars, in which apple trees may grow.

See also

 Dmitri Shostakovich
 Song of the Forests
 Encounter at the Elbe
 Loyalty
 List of Russian-language poets

References

1915 births
1994 deaths
20th-century Russian male writers
Writers from Moscow
People from Moskovsky Uyezd
Communist Party of the Soviet Union members
Maxim Gorky Literature Institute alumni
Stalin Prize winners
Recipients of the Order of Lenin
Recipients of the Order of the Red Banner of Labour
Recipients of the Order of the Red Star
Socialist realism writers
Russian-language poets
Russian Jews
Russian male poets
Russian male writers
Soviet Jews
Soviet male poets
Soviet male writers
Soviet military personnel of the Winter War
Soviet military personnel of World War II
Burials at Donskoye Cemetery